Ithycythara pentagonalis is a species of sea snail, a marine gastropod mollusc in the family Mangeliidae.

Tucker considers Ithycythara auberiana a synonym of Ithycythara pentagonalis Reeve, L.A., 1845

Description
The smooth, ivory white shell has an oblong-ovate shape. It is longitudinally five-angled. It shows compressed ribs at the angles, pointed at the upper part of the ribs.

Distribution
This marine species occurs off St Vincent, West Indies.

References

External links

pentagonalis
Gastropods described in 1845